Eastry is a civil parish in Kent, England, around  southwest of Sandwich. It was voted "Kent Village of the Year 2005".

The name is derived from the Old English Ēast-rige, meaning "eastern province" (c.f. Sūþ-rige  "southern province"), also recorded as Ēastregē, from ēasterra gē (lit. "more easterly area").

Historical legends

Eastry lies on the Roman road north from Dover to Richborough Castle.

It was here that a royal palace of the Saxon kings of Kent stood. One of Kent's oldest legends concerns King Ecgberht of Kent and the murder of his young cousins, Æthelred and Æthelberht, within the palace walls. According to the legend, the royal residence was passed to the priory of Christchurch in Canterbury as penance for the crime. The site of this ancient palace is believed to now be occupied by Eastry Court, adjacent to the church. An archaeological dig by Time Team in 2006 failed to find the royal palace.

Parish church

Eastry's Grade I listed Anglican church is dedicated to St Mary the Virgin. Within the church is a brass standard bushel measure given in 1792.

Governance
An electoral ward in the same name exists. This ward stretches south to Sutton, Kent with a total population taken at the 2011 census of 5,199.

East Kent Light Railway

The East Kent Light Railway was opened to freight traffic in 1911 and passenger traffic in 1916. Its purpose was to serve the new coal mines which were being opened up in the area. Among the stations opened were 'Eastry' and 'Eastry South'. It was one of Colonel Stephens' lines, but was nationalized in 1948 becoming part of British Railways, Southern Region. Both the colliery and the line failed and the section north of Eythorne completely closed by 1951.

The village is also on the Miner's Way Trail. The trail links up the coalfield parishes of East Kent.

Mills

Eastry has had a number of windmills over the centuries. There were four mills marked on the 1819 - 1843 Ordnance Survey map, one of which, the Upper Mill, has been converted into a house. Currently there are three windmills in Eastry.

Notable people
Cyril Randolph (1826–1912), cricketer and clergyman

Sir James Broadwood Lyall (Resting Place )GCIE KCSI (1838 – 4 December 1916) was a British administrator in the Indian Civil Service during the British Raj , Lyallpur, is the third-most-populous city in Pakistan, and the second-largest in the eastern province of Punjab Named after him.

References

External links

Notes on the village
Eastry Cricket Club
Eastry Parish Council Website - Village news, weather and Information
Eastry Church Website - Church news and info

Villages in Kent
Civil parishes in Kent